Flagpole Jitters is a 1956 short subject directed by Jules White starring American slapstick comedy team The Three Stooges (Moe Howard, Larry Fine and Shemp Howard). It is the 169th entry in the series released by Columbia Pictures starring the comedians, who released 190 shorts for the studio between 1934 and 1959.

Plot
The Stooges are three paperhangers who also look after invalid Mary, who uses a wheelchair. While working, they are taken by one poster that advertises a great hypnotist, Svengarlic ("He'll steal your breath away!" the poster announces). The Stooges want the hypnotist to work his magic on Mary so that she can walk again, but Svengarlic is more interested in winning an audience to create a diversion by hypnotizing the Stooges.

While the audience watches the Stooges dance on an overhead flagpole, Svengarlic's henchmen are in the process of robbing a jewelry store. But a distracted bicyclist knocks Svengarlic over and the Stooges are abruptly awakened. They immediately panic when they see where they are, then the flagpole breaks, sending them flying through the open window of the store being robbed, thwarting the theft.

Cast

Credited
 Moe Howard as Moe
 Larry Fine as Larry
 Shemp Howard as Shemp (final film he produced with the team before his death)
 Mary Ainslee as Mary (stock footage)
 Connie Cezon as Mary (new footage)
 David Bond as Svengarlic
 Vernon Dent as Insurance adjuster (stock footage)

Uncredited
 Don C. Harvey as Jack the robber
 Frank Sully as Jim the robber
 Ned Glass as Svengarlic's manager (stock footage)
 Edwin Rochelle as Svengarlic's manager (new footage)
 Richard Alexander as policeman
 Barbara Bartay as Chorus girl with ice cream
 Beverly Thomas as Mary the blonde chorus girl
 Bonnie Henjum	as Chorus girl
 Johnny Kascier as man on bicycle (stock footage)

Production notes
Flagpole Jitters is a remake of 1949's Hokus Pokus using ample stock footage from the original. The films have different endings: Mary is actually paraplegic here, whereas in the original she was a fraud. In Flagpole Jitters, Svengarlic is the fraud.

The Stooges make a reference to Sing Sing Correctional Facility, in which Shemp believes he has hypnotized Moe into thinking he is locked up in the infamous prison.

The character name Svengarlic is a parody of Svengali, the name of a fictional character in George du Maurier's 1894 novel Trilby.

Flagpole Jitters was the last short produced that included new footage of Shemp Howard. For Crimin' Out Loud is commonly thought to be the last film featuring new footage of Shemp. However, the new footage used in For Crimin' Out Loud was filmed on June 30, 1955: Flagpole Jitters was filmed the next day on July 1. Shemp died on November 22, 1955, before any new films were produced.

See also
List of American films of 1956

References

External links 
 
 
Flagpole Jitters at threestooges.net

1956 films
1956 comedy films
American black-and-white films
Films directed by Jules White
The Three Stooges film remakes
Films about hypnosis
Sing Sing
The Three Stooges films
Columbia Pictures short films
1950s English-language films
1950s American films
American comedy short films